13 Violets is the sixth Studio recording from Mother Superior and the second of two to be produced by MC5 legend Wayne Kramer. This is Mother Superior's last record featuring Jason Mackenroth on drums.

Track listing (U.S version)

Euro Version (Fargo)
The European release differs from the U.S. version. 
Tracks appear in a different order.
"Starlett" (3:15) and "What if" (2:51) replace "Everybody Wants" and "Everything is Alright". 
Also there is a bonus video of "Jaded Little Princess" on the compact disc version.

Personnel 
 Jim Wilson – vocals, guitars
 Marcus Blake – bass
 Jason Mackenroth – drums

References

Mother Superior (band) albums
2004 albums
Albums produced by Wayne Kramer (guitarist)